Statistics of Swedish football Division 1 in season 1992.

Spring

Norra

Östra

Västra

Södra

Autumn

Kvalsvenskan

Norra

Östra

Västra

Södra

Footnotes

References
Sweden - List of final tables (Clas Glenning)

1992
2
Sweden
Sweden